Waharakgoda are villages in Sri Lanka. They are located within Central Province and Sabaragamuwa province.

See also
List of towns in Central Province, Sri Lanka

External links

Populated places in Central Province, Sri Lanka